A passeree is an obsolete unit of mass used in Bengal that approximately equalled 4.677  kg (10.3 lb). Five seers made up one passeree. After metrication in the mid-20th century, the unit became obsolete.

See also
List of customary units of measurement in South Asia

References

Units of mass
Customary units in India
Obsolete units of measurement